Jan Hijko van Heteren (December 20, 1916 in Batavia, Dutch East Indies – June 30, 1992 in Breda) was a Dutch water polo player who competed in the 1936 Summer Olympics. He was part of the Dutch team which finished fifth in the 1936 tournament. He played three matches.

References

1916 births
1992 deaths
Dutch male water polo players
Water polo players at the 1936 Summer Olympics
Olympic water polo players of the Netherlands
People from Batavia, Dutch East Indies
Dutch people of the Dutch East Indies